Karl Krumbacher (23 September 1856 – 12 December 1909) was a German scholar who was an expert on Byzantine Greek language, literature, history and culture. He was one of the principal founders of Byzantine Studies as an independent academic discipline in modern universities.

Krumbacher was born at Kürnach im Allgäu in the Kingdom of Bavaria. He studied Classical Philology and Indo-European linguistics at the Universities of Munich and Leipzig. In 1879 he passed the State Exam (Staatsexamen) and was thereafter active as a school teacher until 1891. In 1883 he gain his doctorate (Promotion) and in 1885 his Habilitation in Medieval and Modern Greek philology. From 1897 he was professor of Medieval and Modern Greek Language and Literature at the University of Munich and held the newly created Chair of Byzantine Studies, the first professorial chair in this subject in the world. Krumbacher founded the Byzantinische Zeitschrift (1892), the oldest academic journal of Byzantine Studies, and the Byzantinisches Archiv (1898). His collaborator at the time was Božidar Prokić, the renowned Belgrade Byzantinist. He died in Munich in 1909. His successor as Professor of Byzantine Studies was August Heisenberg, father of physicist Werner Heisenberg.

His most important work is Geschichte der byzantinischen Litteratur von Justinian bis zum Ende des oströmischen Reiches (527-1453) (History of Byzantine Literature from Justinian to the Fall of the East Roman Empire) in 1891. A second edition was published in 1897, with the collaboration of Albert Ehrhard (section on theology) and Heinrich Gelzer (general sketch of Byzantine history, AD 395–1453). The value of the work was greatly enhanced by its lengthy bibliographies and it remained a standard textbook for decades.

Krumbacher's extensive travels in Greece and the Ottoman Empire became the basis of his Griechische Reise (1886). His notable works include studies of the poetry of Michael Glykas (1894) and Kassia (1897) and Populäre Aufsätze (1900). In Das Problem der neugriechischen Schriftsprache (1902) he strongly opposed the efforts of the Katharevousa purists to introduce the classical style into modern Greek language and literature. A full list of his works was published in the memorial edition of Byzantinische Zeitschrift.

See also

Alexander Kazhdan

References

Further reading
 K. Dieterich, 'Zum Gedächtnis an Karl Krumbacher', Neue Jahrbücher für das klassische Altertum, Geschichte und deutsche Literatur und für Pädagogik 13 (1910) 279–295.
 A. Heisenberg, 'Karl Krumbacher', Allgäuer Geschichtsfreund NF 24 (1925) 1–26.
 F. Dölger, 'Karl Krumbacher' in Chalikes. Festgabe für die Teilnehmer am XI. Internationalen Byzantinistenkongreß, München 15. – 20. September 1958  (Freising 1958) 121–135.
 J. Aufhauser: 'Karl Krumbacher. Erinnerungen' in Chalikes. Festgabe für die Teilnehmer am XI. Internationalen Byzantinistenkongreß, München 15. – 20. September 1958 (Freising 1958) 161–187.
 P. Wirth, 'Krumbacher, Karl' in M. Bernath and K. Nehring (eds.) Biographisches Lexikon zur Geschichte Südosteuropas. 2: G – K (= Südosteuropäische Arbeiten 75) (München 1976) 515–516.
 G. Prinzing, 'Ad fontem. Zum Gründungsjahr des Münchner "Seminars für Mittel- und Neugriechische Philologie"' in H. Lamm (ed.), 40 Jahre Deutsch-Griechische Gesellschaft, Germano-Helleniko Syllogos, Wiesbaden. 1959–1999 (Wiesbaden 1999) 14–16.
 P. Schreiner and E. Vogt (ed.), Karl Krumbacher. Leben und Werk (München 2011).

External links

 
 Themenportal bei Propylaeum

1856 births
1909 deaths
German classical scholars
German Lutherans
Scholars of Medieval Greek
Corresponding members of the Saint Petersburg Academy of Sciences
German Byzantinists
19th-century Lutherans
Corresponding Fellows of the British Academy
Scholars of Byzantine literature
Foreign members of the Serbian Academy of Sciences and Arts